Til Death Do Us Part: Carmen and Dave (often written Til Death Do Us Part: Carmen + Dave or Til Death Do Us Part: Carmen & Dave) is a reality television show produced by Fernando Hernández for MTV. It followed the lives of Carmen Electra and Dave Navarro through the events leading up to their anything-but-traditional wedding, culminating with the marriage ceremony and reception. The show first aired on MTV on January 21, 2004, and ran for 7 episodes. The final episode aired on March 3, 2004.

Electra and Navarro were married on November 22, 2003. The couple separated on July 18, 2006, and Electra filed for divorce on August 10, 2006. On February 20, 2007, their divorce was finalized.

Origin 
Unlike Newlyweds: Nick and Jessica and The Osbournes, Til Death Do Us Part: Carmen and Dave concerns only one facet of the subjects' lives: preparations for their wedding. MTV approached Electra and Navarro about producing a wedding series after the couple made Carmen and Dave: An MTV Love Story. That series aired in 2002 and documented the couple's courtship. Electra and Navarro, engaged since August 14, 2001, had been putting off their wedding, but the show forced them to set a date for their nuptials.

The show tried to capture the reality of Electra and Navarro's relationship, but according to Navarro, reality TV is an impossibility "because you're not gonna be real with an eight-man crew in your house."

Follow-up 
The stress of making a reality show can be difficult on a marriage, as evidenced by the breakup of Nick Lachey and Jessica Simpson, but it was apparently not the source of trouble for Electra and Navarro. Electra has denied the existence of any "MTV curse" and said that the reality shows she did with Navarro were not responsible for their later divorce.

Cast 
 Carmen Electra
 Dave Navarro
 Daisy, their pet Yorkshire Terrier (uncredited).

Episodes 
The series aired on Wednesday evenings from January 21 to March 3, 2004.

References

External links 
 Official site on MTV.com
 

MTV original programming
2000s American reality television series
2004 American television series debuts
2004 American television series endings
American dating and relationship reality television series